Hon Wing William Yee (born 18 July 1928) was a Fijian engineer and politician. He was the first Chinese Fijian to be elected to the Legislative Council.

Biography
Yee was born in Zhongshan in China, before moving to Fiji as a child. He attended the Marist Brothers High School in Suva and St Bede's College in Canterbury. He then studied engineering at the University of Auckland, and was the first Fijian Chinese to earn a degree in the subject.

Political career
The 1966 general elections were the first in which Chinese Fijians were able to vote. Yee was an Alliance Party candidate in the three-seat General constituency of Suva, and was elected by a margin of 90 votes. In the 1972 elections he was re-elected in the Suva/Central General constituency of the House of Representatives. He was re-elected again in March 1977 and September 1977, by which time the constituency had been renamed Suva/Central.

Other roles
In 1975 Yee became chairman of the new Chinese Education Society and worked as school manager of the Yat Sen School. He remained chairman until 1983, and held the post again between 1987 and 1996.

References

1928 births
People from Zhongshan
Chinese emigrants to Fiji
People educated at Marist Brothers High School, Fiji
People educated at St Bede's College, Christchurch
University of Auckland alumni
Fijian engineers
Members of the Legislative Council of Fiji
Members of the House of Representatives (Fiji)
Fijian educators
Possibly living people